Manon Landowski (born 1964) is a French singer-songwriter who sings chansons and pop music. She is the author, composer and performer of the musical show Le Manège.

Biography
She is the daughter of French composer Marcel Landowski and granddaughter of sculptor Paul Landowski.

Landowski began playing the piano at the age of 7 and then entered the Conservatoire national Supérieur de danse at the age of 13. Three years later, she entered the Paris Opera. At 17, she left the Opera and wrote her first songs.

Landowski sang in the first part of Cora Vaucaire, Léo Ferré and Juliette Gréco. She gave concerts in Paris, Hauts-de-Seine and other regions of France. As singer, dancer and actress, Landowski played in several musical shows.

Her musical show Le Manège was created at the Opéra-Comique in 1997 (arrangements by Jean-Pierre Pilot). Pierre Cardin produced it in his theater "Espace Cardin" the following year. Directed by Daniel Mesguich the show was a great success in Los Angeles in May 2000.

Selected works
 Le Manège (musical show, author and composer, 1997/1998)
 Mademoiselle Faust (musical show, with Xavier Maurel, 2004)

Discography

Albums
 Sur L'instant (Just'In Distribution, 1989)
 Overground N'Existe Pas (BMG, 1994)

Singles
 Au Loin De Toi / Un Et Deux (D.L.B., 1989)
 On Aurait Du Se Dire (D.L.B., 1989)
 Choisis-Moi (BMG, 1993)
 Overground N'existe Pas (BMG, 1994)

Filmography
 Doux amer (singer: theme song, 1987)
 Star Academy (répétiteur, 2002)

References

External links 
 
 

1964 births
20th-century French women singers
French women pop singers
20th-century French composers
French musical theatre composers
French stage actresses
French musical theatre actresses
Conservatoire de Paris alumni
French people of Polish descent
Singers from Paris
Living people
20th-century women composers